Bearfield may refer to:

Places
Bearfield Township, Perry County, Ohio, United States
Bearfield, an area of Bradford on Avon, Wiltshire, England

Fictional characters
Pike Bearfield, eponymous hero of the Pike Bearfield series of stories by Robert E. Howard